Zhuanyang Boulevard Station, is a southern terminus of Line 3 of Wuhan Metro. It entered revenue service on December 28, 2015. It is located in Hannan District (or Wuhan Economic-Technological Zone, WEDZ).

Station layout

References

Wuhan Metro stations
Line 3, Wuhan Metro
Railway stations in China opened in 2015